Cyprus Airways flies to the following destinations.

Current destinations

References

Lists of airline destinations